Johann Joseph von Semlin (born Mostafa Ali Mirza Khan; 1736–1824) was the reputed son of Nader Shah. After his father's murder, a loyalist brought Ali Mirza Khan to Maria Theresa in Vienna, Austria, who named him "Johann Joseph Freiherr von Semlin". In 1746, when Von Semlin was 10 years old, he was sent to Graz to learn the German language and European culture. In 1756, he converted to Christianity and two years later returned to Vienna.

Early life
Von Semlin was born in 1736 in Isfahan, Persia.

In 1746, at age 10, he moved to Graz and began learning German.

Military service
On completing his education at a Viennese military school, Von Semlin joined the Austrian army, rising after a few years to the rank of Commander. Von Semlin entered the service of the Russian empire and fought in the Seven Years' War as a Major. At the end of the war, he received a Medal of Honor.

Captured in war in Prussia, he was known as the Prince of Persia among his troops. Frederick the Great invited him to his palace and returned him to Maria Theresa.

With two injuries received during his military service, Von Semlin retired in 1792 on a monthly pension of 810 florins.

Retirement

Upon his retirement from the military, Von Semlin caught the attention of the French government. An ambassador of Napoleon requested Von Semlin to attempt to take the throne of Iran, offering him military support. Von Semlin rejected the offer, saying "Neither me nor my children think about the Peacock Throne. Even if I have any rights to become king of Iran, I cede them to Francis II, Holy Roman Emperor, who supported me to this age."

Death
Von Semlin died at the age of 90 in Mödling, near Vienna, and was buried in his home garden. In line with his will and testament, 5 gulden was paid to each poor person who attended his funeral. He signed bills using his Persian name, Ali Mirza Khan, up to his death.

Personal life
Von Semlin married Roza, a Turkic woman, in 1792. They had two sons, Johann (Yahya) and Joseph (Yusef). After attaining the legal age, they both joined the Austrian army.

See also
Afsharid dynasty

References

1736 births
1824 deaths
Iranian emigrants to Austria
Afsharid dynasty
Austrian Christians
18th-century Austrian military personnel
Austrian military personnel of the Seven Years' War
Iranian former Muslims
People from Isfahan
18th-century Iranian people